The post of Mayor of Jackson, Mississippi, was begun in 1834 and was originally referred to as "President of Selectmen" before being changed to "Mayor". The following individuals have held the office:

President of Selectmen

Mayors

See also
 Timeline of Jackson, Mississippi

References

Additional sources
Brinson, Carroll. Jackson/A Special Kind of Place. Jackson, MS: City of Jackson, 1977. LCCN 77-081145.

External links
Jackson, MS Mayor's Office - official website

 
Jackson, Mississippi